Felicitas is a Roman goddess.

Felicitas may also refer to:

People
 Felicitas (martyr), early 3rd-century co-martyr of Saint Perpetua
 Felicitas of Padua, ninth-century saint
 Felicitas of Rome (Felicity of Rome), saint and martyr, said to be martyred with her seven sons
 Felicitas Becker, professor of African history
 Dame Felicitas Corrigan
 Felicitas Goodman, Mexican anthropologist

Other
 Felicitas (film), an Argentine film
 109 Felicitas, a main belt asteroid
 , a Panamanian cargo ship

See also 
 Felicity (disambiguation)
 Santa Felicita di Firenze, the second-oldest church in Florence
 The 1982 single and album Felicità by Italian duo Al Bano and Romina Power